Boscawen-Ûn is a Bronze Age stone circle close to St Buryan in Cornwall, UK. It consists of nineteen upright stones in an ellipse with another, leaning, middle stone just south of the centre. There is a west-facing gap in the circle, which may have formed an entrance. The elliptical circle has diameters .

The Gorseth Kernow was inaugurated here in 1928. An old Welsh triad mentions one of the three principal gorseddau of the Island of Britain as "Beisgawen yn Nyfnwal" (Boscawen in Dumnonia), which was taken to refer to Boscawen-Ûn by the Gorseth's founders. That Welsh triad dates to only the 18th century when it was made up by Iolo Morganwg, Edward Williams.

Location
Boscawen-Un is in southwest Cornwall, in the Penwith district north of St Buryan, by the A30 road from Penzance to Land's End. Both the Merry Maidens stone circle and the two Pipers standing stones can be seen as can the sea.

Boscawen-Un is a Cornish name, from the words bos (farmstead) and scawen (elder or elderberry tree). The suffix Un denotes an adjacent pasture. Therefore, the name translates as the pasture of the farmstead at the elderberry tree.

Construction

The stone circle consists of a central standing stone encircled by 19 other stones, including 18 made of grey granite and one of bright quartz, which describe an ellipse with axes of 24.9 m and 21.9 m. The position of the quartz stone in the southwest may indicate the likely direction of the sun as it moves south after Samhain. At the northeastern edge of the stone circle are two stones in the ground which it is possible had at one time been a burial cist. The large central stone has a feet or axe petroglyph. These engravings are unusual in the United Kingdom, though they can also be observed on some of the stones at Stonehenge. The rock art is only fully illuminated around the summer solstice sunrise, although there is partial illumination around the summer sunset. The circle has been aligned with the rising winter solstice sun from the Lamorna Gap.

There is a wide gap in the west of the circle, which suggests the loss of stones. However this gap may represent, as with the nearby Merry Maidens, an entrance. The central stone is 2.7 m long, but because of its strong inclination to the north-east, the tip is only 2.0 m above the ground. It is claimed by some researchers that the central stone embodies the phallic male principle and the quartz stone represents the female powers of the ring.

History
The stone circle at Boscawen-Un was erected in the Bronze Age. A Bardic group (Cornish: Gorsedd) may have existed in this area, because in the Welsh Triads from the 6th century AD, a Gorsedd of Beisgawen of Dumnonia is named as one of the big three Gorsedds of Poetry of the Island of Britain. Dumnonia was a kingdom in post-Roman Britain, which probably included Cornwall. In 1928 at Boscawen-Un, in the course of the revival of the Cornish language and culture, Henry Jenner founded the Cornish Bard Association and called it the Gorseth Kernow (Gorsedd of Cornwall).

William Camden described the stone circle in his Britannia (ca. 1589) thus: "... in a place called Biscaw Woune are nineteen stones in a circle, twelve feet from each other, and in the circle stands one much larger than the rest." Camden does not mention the central stone leaning at an angle but in 1749 William Stukeley thought it may have been disturbed by someone looking for treasure. William Borlase mapped the circle in 1754 showing eighteen stones standing and one fallen, and at some time in the next hundred years a Cornish hedge was constructed through the circle. The hedge was first mentioned in 1850, by Richard Edmonds, and around 1862 the owner of the land, Miss Elizabeth Carne, had it removed and a new hedge built surrounding the stones. This is, thus, an early example of the preservation of an archaeological monument. In 1864 the area around the stone circle was first studied scientifically. The excavation reports show that the central stone already had its remarkable inclination. A burial mound was discovered near the stone circle, in which urns were located. From this time originates one of the first illustrations of the stone circle, which John Thomas Blight made, when he wrote a book concerning the churches of Cornwall with notes concerning ancient monuments. He also drew a plan of the burial mound and sketched one of the excavated urns.

See also
The site was the setting for the 1978 Doctor Who story "The Stones of Blood", though the episodes were actually filmed at the Rollright Stones.

Other prehistoric stone circles in the former Penwith district
 The Merry Maidens
 Tregeseal East – also known as the Tregeseal Dancing Stones
 Boskednan – also known as the Nine Maidens of Boskednan

References

Further reading
 John Barnatt: Prehistoric Cornwall: The Ceremonial Monuments, Turnstone Press Limited 1982. 
 Ian McNeil Cooke: Standing Stones of the Land's End, Cornwall: Men-an-Tol Studio 1998,

External links

 Boscawen Un stone circle site page on The Megalithic Portal
 Boscawen Un stone circle site page on The Modern Antiquarian

Penwith
Stone circles in Cornwall